Slave to the Music is the second album by Twenty 4 Seven, featuring Nancy Coolen & Stay-C. It was released on November 22, 1993, by Indisc & ZYX Music. The album was successful across Europe and Australasia. The Album received several gold and platinum records in most of the countries where it was marketed and released.

Four singles were released from this record: "Slave to the Music", "Is It Love", "Take Me Away", and "Leave Them Alone".

Track listing
 "Slave to the Music" – 4:03
 "Is It Love" – 3:55
 "Take Me Away" – 3:36
 "Keep On Goin'" – 3:59
 "Music Is My Life" – 4:08
 "Leave Them Alone" – 4:01
 "What Time Is It" – 4:13
 "Take Your Chance" – 3:35
 "Let's Stay" – 4:03
 "Slave to the Music" (Ferry & Garnefski Club Mix) – 5:02
 "Is It Love" (Dancability Club Mix) – 5:09

Personnel
 Ruud van Rijen – arrangements, producer, composer
 William Rutten – photography
 Stay-C – rap vocals, composer
 Nancy Coolen – vocals

Charts

Weekly charts

Year-end charts

Certifications

References

External links
SLAVE TO THE MUSIC TWENTY 4 SEVEN

1993 albums
Twenty 4 Seven albums
ZYX Music albums